Dasan Mykah-Anthone Brown (born September 25, 2001) is a Canadian professional baseball outfielder in the Toronto Blue Jays organization. He is ranked 29th on Major League Baseball's 2022 Top 30 Blue Jays prospects list.

Brown attended Abbey Park High School in Oakville, Ontario, Canada. He was drafted by the Toronto Blue Jays in the third round of the 2019 Major League Baseball draft. He made his professional debut that season with the Gulf Coast Blue Jays.

Brown did not play for a team in 2020 due to the Minor League Baseball season being cancelled because of the Covid-19 pandemic. He returned in 2021 to play for the Dunedin Blue Jays. Brown started 2022 with the Dunedin Blue Jays before being promoted to the Vancouver Canadians.

References

External links

2001 births
Living people
Canadian baseball players
Minor league baseball players
Florida Complex League Blue Jays players
Dunedin Blue Jays players
Vancouver Canadians players
2023 World Baseball Classic players
People from Oakville, Ontario